Gerald W. Kisoun (born 1953) was the deputy commissioner of the Northwest Territories in Canada. He was in the role from 2011 to 2017. He served as acting commissioner of the Northwest Territories between the retirement of George Tuccaro on 10 May 2016 and the appointment of Margaret Thom in June 2017.

Kisoun was born in 1953 in the Mackenzie Delta area and is of Inuvialuit and Gwich'in heritage.

In 2015 Kisoun was awarded Canada's Polar Medal; in the citation he was described as a "well-respected Elder" who had "worked tirelessly at strengthening the awareness and understanding of northern Canada and its peoples".

In February 2016 Herbert Nakimayak made a Members' Statement in the Legislative Assembly of the Northwest Territories about Kisoun's cultural contribution.

References

1953 births
Living people
20th-century First Nations people
21st-century First Nations people
Gwich'in people
Inuit from the Northwest Territories
Inuvialuit people
Northwest Territories Deputy Commissioners
Politicians in the Northwest Territories